This article is a list of historic places in the province of Manitoba entered on the Canadian Register of Historic Places, whether they are federal, provincial, or municipal.  The listings are divided by region.  See the following lists:
 Winnipeg (city only)
 Central Plains Region
 Eastman Region
 Interlake Region
 Northern Region
 Parkland Region
 Pembina Valley Region
 Westman Region

See also

 List of National Historic Sites of Canada in Manitoba